The Trumai (or Trumaí; native name: Ho kod ke) are an indigenous people of Brazil. They currently reside within the Xingu Indigenous Park, in the state of Mato Grosso. They have a population of 258 in 2014. They were 97 in 2011 and 120 in 2006, up from a low of 26 in 1966.

Background
The Trumai are one of the last groups to have settled on the upper Xingu River, moving there in the 19th century from the region between the Xingu and Araguaia Rivers, as a result of attacks from another people. They currently live in four villages in the Xingu Indigenous Park, Terra Preta, Boa Esperança, Steinen and Terra Nova, situated halfway from the Leonardo Villas-Bôas Post and the Diauarum Indigenous Post, where some families also live.

The Trumai are one of the ethnicities included in the standard cross-cultural sample.

They are considered the ones who introduced the jawari ritual ("hopep" in the Trumai language), that is, along with the kwarup, one of the most important inter-tribal festivals in the Upper Xingu cultural complex.

Subsistence
The Trumai are farmers, growing primarily manioc, peppers, and beans.

Language
The Trumai language is not closely related to other languages, and it is considered a language isolate. It is severely endangered, as children are becoming native speakers of Awetï, Suyá, or Portuguese.

Notes

Further reading
Robert F. Murphy and Buell Quain. "The Trumai Indians of Central Brazil." American Anthropologist, New Series, Vol. 58, No. 4 (Aug., 1956), p. 747
Quain, Buell; Murphy, Robert F. (1955). The Trumai Indians of Central Brazil. Locust Valley, N.Y.: J. J. Augustin
 Anne Sutherland Louis. "Alliance or Descent: The Trumai Indians of Central Brazil." Man, New Series, Vol. 6, No. 1 (Mar., 1971), pp. 18–29

External links
 Trumai language dictionary online from IDS (select simple or advanced browsing)
Socioambiental page by Raquel Guirardello (Rice University)
 Trumai on the Documentation of Endangered Languages
 Homepage of a Trumai indigenous artist
 Trumai - 10.5281/zenodo.1008781

Xingu peoples
Indigenous peoples of the Amazon
Indigenous peoples in Brazil